Thomas R. Holmes (born September 19, 1949) is an American former politician. He has served as a Republican member for the 14th district in the South Dakota House of Representatives since 2015.
Before that, he was a teacher at Roosevelt High School in Sioux Falls. He taught classes like Early History Of Mankind.

References

1949 births
Living people
Educators from South Dakota
Politicians from Sioux Falls, South Dakota
Republican Party members of the South Dakota House of Representatives
21st-century American politicians